Komilo (before 2015: Murat) is a village in the Çamlıhemşin District, Rize Province, in the Black Sea Region of Turkey. Its population is 238 (2021).

History 
According to list of villages in Laz language book (2009), name of the village is Komilo, which means "goddess" in Laz language. It is the first Laz village in Turkey that regained its Laz name as official name. Most villagers are ethnically Laz.

Geography

References

Villages in Çamlıhemşin District
Laz settlements in Turkey